B. G. Kher was the first Chief Minister of Bombay State. He had been the Prime Minister of the Bombay Presidency since 1946. The Presidency, on India's independence on 15 August 1947 became the Bombay State. Kher served until 1952 Bombay legislative elections. His government was succeeded by that of Morarji Desai.

List of ministers

Parliamentary secretaries
 Yashwantrao Chavan

References

Indian National Congress
K
K
Cabinets established in 1947
Cabinets disestablished in 1952
Bombay State